The Woman in the Case may refer to:

 The Woman in the Case (play), a 1905 play by Clyde Fitch
 The Woman in the Case (1916 American film), a 1916 American film based on Fitch's play
 The Woman in the Case (1916 Australian film), a 1916 Australian film based on Fitch's play
 The Headline Woman, a 1935 film titled The Woman in the Case in the United Kingdom